Camille-Laurin is a provincial electoral district in Quebec, Canada that elects members to the National Assembly of Quebec. The district is located within the Mercier–Hochelaga-Maisonneuve borough of Montreal. It includes territory between the boundary with Pointe-aux-Trembles borough and the Canadian National railway and between mostly Sherbrooke Street and the Anjou borough and the Saint Lawrence River.

It was created for the 1960 election from a part of Laval electoral district (not to be confused with the modern-day city of Laval, which was not established until 1965).

In the change from the 2001 to the 2011 electoral map, its territory was unchanged.

The riding was known from 1960 to 2022 as Bourget.

Members of the Legislative Assembly / National Assembly

Election results

References

External links
Information
 Elections Quebec

Election results
 Election results (National Assembly)

Maps
 2011 map (PDF)
 2001 map (Flash)
2001–2011 changes (Flash)
1992–2001 changes (Flash)
 Electoral map of Montréal region
 Quebec electoral map, 2011

Provincial electoral districts of Montreal
Quebec provincial electoral districts
Mercier–Hochelaga-Maisonneuve